Louise McBee (June 15, 1924 – March 2, 2021) was an American politician who served in the Georgia House of Representatives from 1993 to 2005.

She died on March 2, 2021, in Athens, Georgia, at age 96.

References

1924 births
2021 deaths
Democratic Party members of the Georgia House of Representatives
Women state legislators in Georgia (U.S. state)
People from Strawberry Plains, Tennessee
21st-century American women